Robert Henry Whitelaw (January 30, 1854 – July 27, 1937) was a U.S. Representative from Missouri.

Born on a farm near Lloyds, Virginia, Whitelaw moved with his father to Cape Girardeau County, Missouri, in 1856.
He returned to Essex County, Virginia, in 1866.
He attended private schools in Tappahannock and Staunton, Virginia, and the law department of the University of Michigan at Ann Arbor.
He was admitted to the bar in 1873 and commenced practice in Cape Girardeau, Missouri.
City attorney in 1873.
He served as prosecuting attorney of Cape Girardeau County in 1874–1878.
He served as member of the State house of representatives in 1883 and 1887.

Whitelaw was elected as a Democrat to the Fifty-first Congress to fill the vacancy caused by the death of James Peter Walker and served from November 4, 1890, to March 3, 1891.
He was not a candidate for election in 1890 to the Fifty-second Congress.
He resumed the practice of law in Cape Girardeau, Missouri.
He retired from active law practice in 1927 and moved to Blodgett, Missouri, and in 1934 to Blytheville, Arkansas, where he died on July 27, 1937.
He was interred in Lorimier Cemetery, Cape Girardeau, Missouri.

References

1854 births
1937 deaths
University of Michigan Law School alumni
Democratic Party members of the Missouri House of Representatives
Democratic Party members of the United States House of Representatives from Missouri